The Madonna and Child with St Jerome is a painting by the Italian Renaissance master Pinturicchio, painted in 1481 and housed in the Gemäldegalerie of Berlin, Germany.

Description
The painting shows an infrequent composition, with the Virgin holding the Child who writes on a book, an allusion to his intervention in the Holy Books. On the right is St. Jerome, recognizable by his cardinal dress, leaving a book on the marble throne where the Madonna sits: in this case this is one of his traditional attributes of knowledge.

Jesus wears a pearl-lined coif which can be seen in another Pinturicchio's work of the period, the Crucifixion between Sts. Jerome and Christoper (c. 1475), now at the Borghese Gallery. The theme, used also by Fiorenzo di Lorenzo, was later abandoned by the Umbrian artist in favour of a free, curly hair.

On the right is an open landscape, a typical element of the Renaissance Umbrian school.

Sources

1481 paintings
Paintings in the Gemäldegalerie, Berlin
Paintings of the Madonna and Child by Pinturicchio
Pinturicchio
Books in art